Măneciu is a commune in Prahova County, Muntenia, Romania. It is composed of nine villages: Cheia, Chiciureni, Costeni, Făcăieni, Gheaba, Măneciu-Pământeni, Măneciu-Ungureni (the commune centre), Mânăstirea Suzana, and Plăiețu.

Cheia village is a mountain resort, surrounded by the Ciucaș Mountains. Cheia Monastery is located to the southeast of the village.

Natives
 Robert Negoiță

References

Communes in Prahova County
Localities in Muntenia